The Kamenice is a 35.6-kilometre-long river in the Děčín District, in northwestern Czech Republic. It originates in the Lusatian Mountains and then flows through the national park of Bohemian Switzerland, emptying into the Elbe River in Hřensko.

Rivers of the Ústí nad Labem Region
Elbe Sandstone Mountains
Bohemian Switzerland
Lusatian Mountains